Kunwar Mohinder Singh Bedi pen name Sahar was an Indian Urdu poet. The Times of India called him a "noted Urdu poet".

Personal life
Sahar was born in Montgomery, Punjab, British India on 9 March 1909 now in Pakistan and after Partition of India-Pakistan his family shifted to Fazilka, India

Career
His poetry is varied and includes traditional themes of love and yearning but also themes of unity, peace between India and Pakistan and humor. His poetry is considered to belong to the same transreligious and transnational tradition as that of other well-known poets from the Indian subcontinent such as Muhammad Iqbal, Faiz Ahmad Faiz and Ahmad Faraz.

Sahar's first book of poetry was T̤ulūʻ-i saḥar (1962) (translation "Advent of Daybreak"; the title is a play on words as pen name "Sahar", in Urdu means daybreak). In 1983, he published a collection of autobiographical poetry titled Yādon̲ kā jashn ("A Celebration of Memories").

An international event to celebrate his poetry, called Jashan-e-Sahar ("A celebration for Sahar"), was held in the U.A.E. in 1992.

Poetry
An example of his use of humor to make a serious point is the following Ruba'i:

Movies
Kanwar Mohinder Singh Bedi was also involved in the Indian film industry and produced three movies:
Man Jeete Jag Jeet (1973)
Dukh Bhanjan Tera Naam (1974)
Charandas (1977)

Kanwar Mohinder Singh Bedi Award

An award was created in his honor known as the Kanwar Mohinder Singh Bedi Award, presented by Haryana Urdu Akademi. In 2023 it carried a cash prize of INR 21,000, a shawl, a memento and citation.

 Winners
1990: Yusuf Nazim
1991: Narendra Luther
1992: Raza Naqvi Wahi
1997: Mujtaba Hussain
2006: Ibn-e-Kanwal
2008: Dharmadev Swami
2009: Himmat Singh Sinha
2010: Kumar Panipati
2013: S P Sharma Tafta
2017: Krishna Kumar ‘Toor’
2018: Sultan Anjum
2019: Naseeruddin Azhar
2020: Qamar Raees

See also
 List of Indian poets
 List of Urdu language poets

Bibliography
T̤ulūʻ-i saḥar, 1962 ("Advent of Daybreak")
Yādon̲ kā jashn, 1983 ("A Celebration of Memories")

References

External links
 Fazilite Kanwar Mohinder Sing Bedi "Sahar" - A Tribute
مہندر سنگھ بیدی سحر - ۔پروفائل اور سرگزشت | ریختہ

1908 births
1998 deaths
Poets from Punjab, India
Indian male poets
Urdu-language poets from India
Punjabi people
20th-century Indian poets
20th-century Indian male writers